Mariella Greta Venter (born 10 January 2000) is a South African competitive swimmer who specializes in the backstroke. She competed in the women's 100 metre backstroke at the 2019 World Aquatics Championships.

She competed in the women's 4 x 100 metre medley relay at the 2020 Summer Olympics.

Venter competes at the collegiate level for the University of Michigan.

References

2000 births
Living people
South African female swimmers
Place of birth missing (living people)
Female backstroke swimmers
Swimmers at the 2018 Summer Youth Olympics
Commonwealth Games competitors for South Africa
Swimmers at the 2018 Commonwealth Games
Swimmers at the 2020 Summer Olympics
Olympic swimmers of South Africa
Michigan Wolverines women's swimmers
21st-century South African women